Bernhard Wilhelm Maria Pankok (16 May 1872, in Münster – 5 April 1943, in Baierbrunn) was a German painter, graphic artist, architect, and designer. His works are characterized by the transition between Art Nouveau and the International Style. His furniture and book design, such as the catalog for the German section of the Exposition Universelle (1900) in Paris, have garnered him the most recognition.

Biography 
From 1889 to 1891, he studied at the  Kunstakademie Düsseldorf, with Heinrich Lauenstein, Adolf Schill, Hugo Crola and Johann Peter Theodor Janssen. He opened a studio in Munich in 1892; working as a freelance artist, graphic designer and illustrator for the magazines Pan and Jugend.

In 1901, he married Antoinette Coppenrath (1870–1920),a sister of the landscape painter . The following year, they moved to Stuttgart. In 1907, he became a member of the Berlin Secession and the Deutscher Werkbund. Shortly after, he was involved in the process of creating new buildings for the Academy of Arts. When they opened in 1913, he was named the first Director there, a post he held until 1937.

He was a major participant in the Werkbund Exhibition (1914), in Cologne. He was also elected a member of the Board of Directors at the Deutscher Künstlerbund. In 1924, he married his second wife, Marianne Geyer (1891–1941).

In 1930, he became a "foreign" member of the Munich Secession. Three years later, he was named an honorary member of the Academy of Fine Arts, Munich. Despite being under a great deal of pressure, he never joined the Nazi Party. In 1942, the newly reorganized State Academy of Fine Arts made him an honorary member.

On the thirtieth anniversary of his death, in 1973, the Landesmuseum Württemberg presented a major retrospective of his works.

Selected works

References

Further reading 
 Hermann Gretsch: Bernhard Pankok zum Gedächtnis: Rede, gehalten anläßlich der Immatrikulationsfeier der Akademie der bildenden Künste in Stuttgart am 14. Mai 1943.  Stüttgart, 1943.
 Hans Klaiber: Bernhard Pankok: Ein Lebensbild. Stüttgart: Staatliche Akademie der bildenden Künste Stüttgart, 1981.
 Wolfgang Kermer (ed.): Zwischen Buch-Kunst und Buch-Design: Buchgestalter der Akademie und ehemaligen Kunstgewerbeschule in Stuttgart: Werkbeispiele und Texte. Cantz: Ostfildern-Ruit, 1996. .
 Andrea Tietze: "Pankok, Bernhard Wilhelm Maria." In: Neue Deutsche Biographie 20, Duncker & Humblot, Berlin 2001. , pg.32 f.

External links 

 
 More works by Pankok @ ArtNet
 Biography of Pankok @ the Museum der Dinge
 Timeline and works @ the Galerie Ostendorff, Münster

1872 births
1943 deaths
20th-century German painters
20th-century German male artists
German male painters
Architects from Stuttgart
People from Münster